Laoshan Subdistrict is a subdistrict on the southeast of Shijingshan District , Beijing, China. It borders Tiancunlu Subdistrict to the north, Wangshoulu and Yongdinglu Subdistricts to the east, Lugu and Babaoshan Subdistricts to the south, and Bajiao Subdistrict to the west. In 2020, it had a population of 40,023.

This subdistrict is located on the southern slope of Laoshan, and thus named after the mountain.

Administrative Division 
As of 2021, Laoshan Subdistrict consists of 12 communities:

See also 

 List of township-level divisions of Beijing

References 

Shijingshan District
Subdistricts of Beijing